BSX may refer to:
 Bendigo Stock Exchange, in Australia
 Bermuda Stock Exchange
 Boston Scientific, a Fortune 500 medical device company
 BS-X: Sore wa Namae o Nusumareta Machi no Monogatari, the video game interface for the Satellaview.
 Sometimes used by fans to refer to the Satellaview device itself.
 Brain-specific homeobox, a homeobox transcription factor, important for neural development